The Good Witch's Garden is a Hallmark Channel television film, the sequel to The Good Witch. It premiered on Hallmark Channel on February 7, 2009.

Plot
Cassie Nightingale (Catherine Bell) has settled into Middleton and is busy making Grey House into a bed and breakfast. Her boyfriend, Chief of Police Jake Russell (Chris Potter), and his kids, Brandon (Matthew Knight) and Lori (Hannah Endicott-Douglas), are happy to have Cassie in the neighborhood, but before long, a stranger named Nick (Rob Stewart) appears. He knows more than he should and uses his charms to gain Martha Tinsdale and the rest of the city council's trust. He reveals himself to be the sole heir of the Grey Lady's lover, the actual owner of Grey House. The Lady appears to have simply taken the house after his mysterious disappearance.  Papers prove this entitlement to legal ownership, yet Jake Russell is suspicious and eager to help a bewildered Cassie. Cassie hands over the house and later finds it for sale in a newspaper ad.

On a history project for school, Lori is partnered with a girl who keeps running off whenever they meet to work on it. The girl later reveals she is illiterate. With Lori's support, she gets help and the two of them find a way to work together.

While researching in the library, Lori stumbles upon a book. The book cover appears empty at first, but soon letters appear revealing it to be a collection of fictional stories written by the Grey Lady. All stories revolve around a certain captain, who had been believed to be her lover and who Nick claims to be related to. However, as the book confirms, he was merely a fictional character made real over time by the people of Middleton. Jake arrests Nick after discovering the man is using one of many fake identities taken on to con rightful owners out of their properties.
 
The movie ends with a garden party held at Cassie's, where Martha Tisdale finally accepts her as a valuable member of the community. Under the lights of fireworks, Jake proposes to Cassie and she accepts.

Cast and characters
 Catherine Bell as Cassandra "Cassie" Nightingale, who is proud of being a Merrywick and therefore the rightful owner of Grey House. When Nick arrives and strips her of ownership, she is at first tempted to give in to the circumstances, but is encouraged by Jake to fight. At the end of the movie, she becomes engaged to Jake Russell. At the garden party, she hints the events had been fated to unite her and the townspeople.
 Chris Potter as Chief of Police Jake Russell. Despite being very fond of Cassie, he has initial doubts about their compatibility as a couple. When working with Cassie on the case, he realizes how well they work with each other and comes to regard their different perspectives as beneficial. At the end of the movie, he proposes to her.
 Catherine Disher as Councilor Martha Tinsdale. Martha continues her mistrust and dislike of Cassie. Her sympathy towards Nick is high at the start and grows when she finds out he has taken over Grey House. After Nick's arrest she makes a good faith effort to establish a positive relationship with Cassie.
 Peter MacNeill as George O'Hanrahan, the father of Jake's late wife. Along with Jake, George looks after his grandchildren and encourages Jake's relationship with Cassie. George becomes fond of Gwen, a member of the gardening club, and the two dance together at the garden party.
 Rob Stewart as Nick Chasen, a mysterious man. Nick seems to know a lot about Cassie. He claims to be a descendant of the Captain said to have been the Grey Lady's lover until he disappeared. Nick stays at Grey House as the Bed & Breakfast's first guest, and sneaks around the house a lot. He quickly becomes popular among the town's citizens. He briefly acquires the ownership of Grey House, but is quickly discovered to be a con artist and criminal.
 Matthew Knight as Brandon Russell. Brandon struggles to become part of a group of boys who make him do dares to prove his worth. Cassie gives him a mirror which helps him stay true to himself.
 Elizabeth Lennie as Gwen
 Hannah Endicott-Douglas as Lori Russell. Lori tries to solve the mystery of a gardening tool from 1816 that saved someone's life. The search for answers draws in her history partner, and finally leads the girl to reveal a secret to Lori.
 Noah Cappe as Deputy Derek Sanders, a laid back and easygoing police officer.
 Paul Miller as Tom Tinsdale, Mayor of Middleton and Martha's husband.

Working title
The film was originally to be titled Good Witch 2: Magic Never Fades.

Reception
The film's premiere did moderately well for Hallmark Channel.  It scored a 2.7 household rating with over 2.3 million homes, over 3.1 million total viewers and 4.2 million unduplicated viewers.  This performance ranked it #1 in the time period as well as the second-highest-rated Prime Time cable movie of the week and day, among all ad-supported cable networks.  The film boosted Hallmark Channel to rank #3 in Prime Time for the day, and #5 for the week.

References

External links
 The Good Witch's Garden on Hallmark Channel
 The Good Witch's Garden on Hallmark Channel's Press Site
 

The Good Witch
2009 television films
2009 films
American fantasy films
Canadian fantasy films
Canadian television films
English-language Canadian films
Films shot in Hamilton, Ontario
Hallmark Channel original films
Films directed by Craig Pryce
2000s American films
2000s Canadian films